Ranastalam is a village adjoining National Highway 16 in Srikakulam district of the Indian state of Andhra Pradesh. There are nearly 55 villages in Ranastalam mandal.Jrpuram kon damulagam kosta pydibheemavaram kammasigadam etc.

References 

Villages in Srikakulam district